Llandygwydd is a small settlement in Ceredigion, west Wales, between Newcastle Emlyn and the town of Cardigan.

Amenities & History 
A small stream runs through the village. There also is a parish church with a small graveyard.

It has no commercial buildings. The post office closed in 2001. The village hall is mostly used as a polling station by the local people. The village also has its own short mat bowling club, which meets at the village hall.

Notable people
 The cleric Theophilus Evans of Pen-y-wenallt was christened here in 1693.
Morgan Jones (1829–1905), first-class cricketer and High Sheriff of Cardiganshire

References

External links 
www.geograph.co.uk : photos of Llandygwydd and surrounding area

Villages in Ceredigion